The National Large Solar Telescope (NLST) is a Gregorian multi-purpose open telescope proposed to be built in Merak village in Ladakh in India and aims to study the sun's microscopic structure.

The Indian Institute of Astrophysics is the nodal agency charged with various scientific bodies like the Indian Space Research Organisation (ISRO), Aryabhatta Research Institute of Observational-Sciences, Tata Institute of Fundamental Research (TIFR) and Inter-University Centre for Astronomy and Astrophysics (IUCAA) also participating.

Location
The proposed site for the location of the telescope is Merak village in Ladakh, India. The village is near Pangong Lake.

Telescope
NLST is proposed to be on-axis alt-azimuth Gregorian multi-purpose open telescope with the provision of carrying out night time stellar observations using a spectrograph. It hopes to resolve features on the Sun of the size of about 0.1 arcsec. The focal plane instruments are to include a high resolution polarimeteric package to measure polarization with an accuracy of 0.01 per cent; a high spectral resolution spectrograph to obtain spectra in 5 widely separated absorption lines simultaneously and high spatial resolution narrow band imagers in various lines.

See also
List of solar telescopes
Lists of telescopes

References

Solar telescopes
Science and technology in Ladakh
Buildings and structures in Ladakh